Anna Gennadievna Erschler, née Dyubina, (Анна Геннадьевна Эршлер; born 14 February 1977), is a Russian mathematician, working in France. She specializes in geometric group theory and probability theory, in particular, random walks on groups.

Education and career
Beginning in 1994 Erschler studied mathematics at Saint Petersburg State University receiving there her M.Sc. in 1999 and then studied in the academic year 1999–2000 at Tel Aviv University. In 2001 she received her Ph.D. from Saint Petersburg State University under the direction of  Anatoly Vershik, with a thesis titled Geometric und probabilistic properties of wreath products. In October 2012 she received her habilitation (Thèse d'État) from the University of Paris 11.

She was a postdoc in the academic year 2001–2002 at the Steklov Institute in Saint Petersburg and in the academic year 2002–2003 at the Institut des Hautes Études Scientifiques in Paris and at IRMAR in Rennes. From October 2003 to December 2005 she was Chargée de recherche at the Centre national de la recherche scientifique, University of Lille. At CNRS, University Paris 11, she was from January 2006 to September 2013 Chargée de recherché and then from October 2013 to April 2013 Directrice de recherche. From May 2014 she has been Directrice de recherche at CNRS, DMA/ENS, Orsay.

She is a co-editor of the journal Groups, Geometry and Dynamics.

Recognition
Erschler received in 2001 the Möbius Prize of the Independent University of Moscow and in 2002 the Annual Prize of the Saint Petersburg Mathematical Society. In 2010 she was an invited speaker at the International Congress of Mathematicians in Hyderabad, where she gave a talk on Poisson–Furstenberg boundaries, large-scale geometry and growth of groups. In the summer of 2010 at the University of Göttingen she was the ninth Emmy Noether visiting professor, lecturing on random walks and Poisson–Furstenberg boundaries. In 2015 she received the Élie Cartan Prize of the French Academy of Sciences. In 2020 she won the CNRS Silver Medal.

Selected publications
 
 
  (published as Anna Erschler-Dyubina)

References

External links
 mathnet.ru

1977 births
Living people
20th-century Russian mathematicians
20th-century women mathematicians
21st-century Russian mathematicians
21st-century women mathematicians
Group theorists
Probability theorists
Russian expatriates in France
Russian mathematicians
Saint Petersburg State University alumni